The 2011 World Wrestling Championships was held at the Sinan Erdem Dome in Istanbul, Turkey. The event took place between September 12 and September 18, 2011.

Medal table

Team ranking

Medal summary

Men's freestyle

Men's Greco-Roman

Women's freestyle

Participating nations
825 competitors from 102 nations participated.

 (6)
 (2)
 (2)
 (3)
 (14)
 (1)
 (6)
 (21)
 (21)
 (10)
 (19)
 (3)
 (14)
 (2)
 (4)
 (1)
 (21)
 (3)
 (12)
 (2)
 (1)
 (7)
 (10)
 (2)
 (7)
 (3)
 (6)
 (5)
 (2)
 (2)
 (5)
 (1)
 (7)
 (14)
 (14)
 (19)
 (7)
 (17)
 (3)
 (2)
 (3)
 (2)
 (16)
 (18)
 (14)
 (2)
 (1)
 (6)
 (15)
 (1)
 (21)
 (3)
 (21)
 (17)
 (8)
 (9)
 (3)
 (3)
 (1)
 (1)
 (14)
 (16)
 (14)
 (2)
 (1)
 (2)
 (1)
 (1)
 (5)
 (9)
 (8)
 (2)
 (1)
 (4)
 (2)
 (18)
 (4)
 (2)
 (1)
 (18)
 (21)
 (2)
 (6)
 (3)
 (10)
 (2)
 (4)
 (17)
 (15)
 (10)
 (8)
 (7)
 (10)
 (10)
 (21)
 (3)
 (21)
 (1)
 (21)
 (17)
 (17)
 (8)

References 

 Results Book

External links 
 

 
FILA Wrestling World Championships
World Wrestling Championships
World Wrestling Championships
World 2011
Sport in Istanbul
September 2011 sports events in Turkey